Tariq Sims (born 9 February 1990) is a Fiji international rugby league footballer who plays as a  and  for the Melbourne Storm in the NRL. 

He previously played for the North Queensland Cowboys and the Newcastle Knights in the National Rugby League, and at representative level for New South Wales Country and New South Wales in the State of Origin series.

Early career

Sims was born in Gerringong, New South Wales, Australia.

He played junior football in his home town of Gerringong, New South Wales, before moving to Queensland, where he played in the NYC for the Brisbane Broncos from 2008 to 2010. He was initially a winger, but was told by the Broncos to put on weight and turned into a forward. His brothers, Korbin and Ashton, both played with him at the Broncos at the same time; Ashton was a member of the first-grade squad, while Korbin played NYC with him. Tariq was the 2010 Toyota Cup season's player of the year, but he left the Broncos without playing a first-grade match. He and Ashton joined the North Queensland Cowboys for the 2011 season. Upon leaving the Broncos, he praised the club's youth system for his development as a player, saying that he was leaving only to get the opportunity to play first-grade football.

Playing career

2011–2014: North Queensland Cowboys
In round 2 of the 2011 NRL season, Sims made his NRL debut for North Queensland against the Newcastle Knights off the interchange bench in the Cowboys 34–22 loss at 1300SMILES Stadium.

In Sims' next match in round 3 against the Melbourne Storm, he scored his first NRL career try in North Queensland's 34–6 win at 1300SMILES Stadium. In round 13 against the Canberra Raiders at Canberra Stadium, Sims scored a double in the match. One of the tries was the longest try scored by a North Queensland forward by running 45m to score in the Cowboys comeback 40–24 win after trailing 22–0 after 21 minutes of the match. In Round 25 against the Cronulla-Sutherland Sharks, Sims' season ended when he broke his leg in the Cowboys 28–20 win.

Despite his curtailed season, Sims was a finalist in the best rookie and best second-rower categories of the Dally M Awards. During the year, Sims was invited to join the New South Wales State of Origin team during training. Sims finished his stellar debut year in the NRL with him playing in 20 matches and scoring 5 tries. On 8 September 2011, Sims re-signed with North Queensland on a four-year contract to the end of the 2015 season. On 2 November 2011, Sims was shortlisted for the Rugby League International Federation's Second Rower of the Year award.

After breaking his leg early in 2012, Sims returned in Round 5 to play in the Cowboys 22–6 victory over the Canberra Raiders at Canberra Stadium. Sims came off the bench in the second half and put in a memorable performance, performing a big hit on Tom Learoyd-Lahrs in his first few minutes on the field. Sims soon returned to the Cowboys starting line-up.

On 22 April 2012, Sims made his representative debut for NSW Country Origin against NSW City Origin off the interchange bench and scored a double in the 24–22 loss at Mudgee.

Just 7 matches into his comeback from a broken leg, playing against the Penrith Panthers, Sims attempted to save a try but was involved in a freak accident with Penrith back rower Cameron Ciraldo which ended with Sims breaking his leg for a second time in the space of a year and in exactly the same spot as the previous break. The Cowboys went on to win the match 30–28, with Tariq's brother Ashton scoring the match-winning try in the dying minutes of the game.

Sims had a successful surgery which involved a steel rod being inserted into his leg to help with the healing process and to stop another break. He returned to full contact training in the week of the Cowboys' semi-final loss to the Manly Warringah Sea Eagles. Sims played in 7 matches and scored 1 try in 2012. On 21 December, Sims was taken to hospital after suffering from dehydration at North Queensland's off season army-style boot camp at Lavarack Barracks.

In 2013, Sims made his second return from injury in a 28–24 trial victory over his former club Brisbane Broncos on 4 February. He started the match in the second row and had three stints in the game. Impressing coaching staff and full of confidence.

On 21 April, Sims played for NSW Country Origin against NSW City Origin off the interchange bench in the 18–12 win at Coffs Harbour. Sims finished the season with 4 tries from 23 matches.

Qualifying through his mother, Sims was selected in the Fiji squad for the 2013 Rugby League World Cup alongside his brothers, Ashton and Korbin. He made his international debut for Fiji against Ireland at second-row and scored a try in the 32–14 win at Spotland Stadium. Sims played in 5 matches and scored 1 try in the tournament.

On 4 May 2014, Sims played prop for NSW Country Origin in the 26–26 draw at Dubbo. On 4 July, Sims signed a two-year contract with the Newcastle Knights starting in 2015, where he would join his younger brother Korbin Sims.

On 16 September 2014, Sims missed the rest of the NRL finals series after making a guilty plea for a grade three shoulder charge offence for a second-half incident with Brisbane Broncos fullback Justin Hodges in North Queensland's 32–20 victory in Week 1 of the elimination finals at 1300SMILES Stadium. That match was Sims' last for the Cowboys. The Cowboys were later eliminated in Week 2 by the Sydney Roosters. Sims scored 6 tries in 21 matches in 2014.

2015–2016: Newcastle Knights
In round 5 of the 2015 season, Sims made his club debut for the Newcastle Knights against the St. George Illawarra Dragons at second-row in the Knights 13–0 loss at Hunter Stadium. On 3 May, Sims played for NSW Country off the interchange bench and scored a try in the 34–22 win at Wagga Wagga.

Sims scored his first club try for the Knights in the 30–10 loss to the Manly-Warringah Sea Eagles, Brookvale Oval in Round 9, 2016. On 12 June, Sims was called into the New South Wales Blues squad as cover, being named as 19th man for Game 2 of the 2015 State of Origin series after Dragons forward Tyson Frizell was ruled out from injury. Brother Korbin was named as 20th man for Queensland two days beforehand. Sims finished his first year with the Knights with him playing in 19 matches and scoring 4 tries, as the club collected the wooden spoon.

On 13 January, Sims was named in the emerging New South Wales Blues squad. In February, he co-captained the Knights in the 2016 NRL Auckland Nines. On 26 February, he was announced as one of three co-captains for the Knights alongside Trent Hodkinson and Jeremy Smith. On 8 May, for the fifth year in a row, he played for New South Wales Country against New South Wales City. On 31 May, he signed a 3-year contract with the St. George Illawarra Dragons starting in 2017. However, after negotiating over the next month, he was released early to the Dragons mid-season. He played in 8 matches for the Knights that season before the mid-season switch.

2016–2022: St George Illawarra Dragons
In round 15 of the 2016 season, he made his club debut for St. George Illawarra against the Melbourne Storm, where he played off the interchange bench in the Dragons' 20–10 win at WIN Stadium.

In 2017, Sims was part of the St. George Illawarra side which finished 9th in the 2017 NRL season despite being in the top 8 for most of the season. A disastrous run of form, culminating in a heartbreaking round 26 loss to Canterbury which allowed North Queensland to overtake them into 8th spot, saw them miss out on the finals.

In 2018, Sims was selected as part of The NSW Blues squad for the 2018 State of Origin series. Sims did not feature in the first two games of the series for The Blues but was called into the side for the dead rubber game 3 match in Brisbane.
Sims was part of the St George Illawarra side which qualified for the finals in 2018.  In week one of the finals, St George Illawarra faced a highly fancied Brisbane side at Suncorp Stadium with not many experts predicting an upset.  St George Illawarra ended up surprising many as they won the match 48–18 with Sims scoring 3 tries.  The following week, Sims was taken from the field with a knee injury as St George Illawarra were eliminated from the finals series losing 13–12 to South Sydney.

Sims was selected for New South Wales in Game 2 of the 2019 State of Origin series which New South Wales won 38–6 at the new Perth Stadium.  In round 21 of the 2019 NRL season, Sims scored 2 tries as St George Illawarra defeated the Gold Coast 40–28 at Kogarah Oval.

On 12 August, Sims was ruled out for the rest of the season after having groin surgery.  Sims had been battling the groin injury for most of the year but decided to undergo surgery as St George Illawarra had been ruled out of finals contention.

He made a total of 9 appearances for St. George Illawarra in the 2020 NRL season as the side finished a disappointing 13th on the table.

In round 4 of the 2021 NRL season, Sims put in a man of the match performance scoring two tries in his side's 22-13 victory over Newcastle.

On 30 May, Sims was selected for game one of the 2021 State of Origin series.  He played in all three games as New South Wales won the series 2-1.

Sims played a total of 21 matches for St. George Illawarra in the 2021 NRL season as the club finished 11th on the table and missed out on the finals.

On 22 April, it was announced Sims would join Melbourne in 2023 on a one-year-deal. On 29 May, Sims was selected by New South Wales to play in game one of the 2022 State of Origin series.
On 19 June, Sims was not selected for the second game of the series after New South Wales lost the opening match 16-10.

In round 17 of the 2022 NRL season, Sims was sin binned twice in 25 minutes during the clubs 32-18 loss against Brisbane.
In round 21, Sims was sent to the sin bin for a dangerous high tackle where he knocked out Cronulla's Connor Tracey during St. George Illawarra's 24-18 loss.  Sims was later suspended for four matches over the tackle which ended his playing time at St. George Illawarra.

Personal life
Sims is married to Ashleigh Sims who is a professional boxer. Sims is the older brother of Korbin Sims, who in 2019 joined him at the St George Illawarra club, and the younger brother of Ashton Sims, who plays for the Toronto Wolfpack. His elder sister Ruan Sims currently plays for the Sydney Roosters in the NRL Women's Premiership, while his other sister, Canecia (CJ) has previously played American football (gridiron) for the Gold Coast Stingrays, but in 2019 signed with the Tweed Heads Seagulls rugby league club.

References

External links
St. George Illawarra Dragons profile
Dragons profile
NRL profile

1990 births
Living people
Australian rugby league players
Australian people of Fijian descent
Country New South Wales Origin rugby league team players
Fiji national rugby league team players
New South Wales Rugby League State of Origin players
North Queensland Cowboys players
Newcastle Knights players
Newcastle Knights captains
St. George Illawarra Dragons players
Melbourne Storm players
Mackay Cutters players
Junior Kangaroos players
Rugby league second-rows
Rugby league locks
Rugby league players from New South Wales
Tariq